Menetus is a North American genus of freshwater snails, aquatic pulmonate gastropod mollusks in the family Planorbidae, the ramshorn snails.

Species
Species within this genus include:

subgenus Micromenetus F. C. Baker, 1945
 Menetus dilatatus (Gould, 1841) - the type species

subgenus ?
 Menetus alabamensis
 Menetus brogniartianus
 Menetus floridensis
 Menetus opercularis
 Menetus portlandensis
 Menetus sampsoni

References

External links 
 AnimalBase info at: 

Planorbidae